Charles Bakule Kizza (born 18 January 1974), known as Charles Kizza, is a Ugandan boxer. He competed in the men's heavyweight event at the 1996 Summer Olympics.

References

External links
 
 

1974 births
Living people
Ugandan male boxers
Olympic boxers of Uganda
Boxers at the 1996 Summer Olympics
Commonwealth Games bronze medallists for Uganda
Commonwealth Games medallists in boxing
Boxers at the 1994 Commonwealth Games
Place of birth missing (living people)
Heavyweight boxers
Medallists at the 1994 Commonwealth Games